Pecong is a 1990 play by American playwright Steve Carter. Set "well in the past" on a fictional Caribbean island, the play tells the story of a sorceress who falls madly in love with a shallow womanizer.

Original production
Directed by Dennis Zacek
Produced by Victory Gardens Theatre
Artistic Director: Dennis Zacek
Set designer: James Dardenne
Costume designer: Claudia Boddy
Lighting designer: Robert Shook
Sound designer/stage manager: Galen G. Ramsey
Composer/percussionist: Willy Steele
Choreographer: TC Carson
Assistant director: Sandra Jean Verthein
Opened: January 9, 1990 at the Ruth Page Dance Center

Cast

 Pat Bowie - Granny Root
 Celeste Williams - Mediyah
 Gary Yates - Cedric
 Catherine Slade - Persis
 Wandachristine - Faustina
 Ernest Perry, Jr. - Creon Pandit
 Diane White - Sweet Bella
 Daniel Oreskes - Jason Allcock

 Feleccia C. Boyd
 Shanesia L. Davis
 Lydia R. Gartin
 Shawn Goodwin
 Thomas W. Greene V
 Alison Halstead
 Dexter L. Warr
 Christopher Williams

– Oppidans

Awards and nominations
1990 Jeff Award, Best New Work
1990 (Jeff Award), Willy Steele-Original Score
1993 Bay Area Drama Critics Award, Best Choreography (Halifu Osumare)

Publication

Pecong is published by Broadway Play Publishing Inc.

External links
New York Times review of 1992 production

References

1990 plays
Plays by Steve Carter (playwright)
Caribbean in fiction
Plays set in North America
African-American plays
Plays based on Medea (Euripides play)